Walter Newton (2 January 1902 – 19 October 1945) was a Canadian boxer. He competed in the men's featherweight event at the 1920 Summer Olympics. At the 1920 Antwerp Summer Olympics, he received a bye in the Round of 32 and then lost in the Round of 16 to Nick Clausen of Denmark.

References

External links
 

1902 births
1945 deaths
Canadian male boxers
Olympic boxers of Canada
Boxers at the 1920 Summer Olympics
Boxers from Toronto
Featherweight boxers